Douglas Emlen (born April 29, 1967) is an evolutionary biologist and Professor of Biology at the University of Montana. He has received the Presidential Early Career Award for Scientists and Engineers from the Office of Science and Technology Policy at the White House, multiple research awards from the National Science Foundation, and the E. O. Wilson Naturalist Award from the American Society of Naturalists. His research provides insights into the development and evolution of exaggerated male weaponry, such as the horns found in scarab beetles. He combines approaches from behavioral ecology, genetics, phylogenetics, and developmental biology to understand how evolution has shaped these bizarre structures. His current projects include an examination of how altered expression of appendage patterning genes contributes to species differences in the shape of horns, and how the insulin receptor (InR) pathway modulates the size of male weapons in response to the larval nutritional environment. He recently starred in documentaries about his work for the BBC (Nature’s Wildest Weapons) and NOVA (Extreme Animal Weapons), and released his first narrative nonfiction book for middle school readers, Beetle Battles: One Scientist’s Journey of Adventure and Discovery in December 2019. He is the grandson of John T. Emlen.

Education
Emlen received a B.A. from Cornell University in 1989, and a Ph.D. from Princeton University in 1994.

Selected awards and honors 
 American Academy of Arts and Sciences (2016)
 Phi Beta Kappa Award in Science (2015, for Animal Weapons)
 E. O. Wilson Naturalist Award, The American Society of Naturalists (2013)
 Golden Key Honor Society (2012)
 Elected to the council, Society for the Study of Evolution (2007-2009)
 Presidential Early Career Award for Scientists and Engineers, Office of Science and Technology Policy, Executive Office of the President, Washington, D.C. 2002
 American Naturalists Young Investigator Prize (1997)

Bibliography
 Evolution: Making Sense of Life (2012), co-authored with Carl Zimmer. 
 Animal Weapons: The Evolution of Battle (2014). 
 Beetle Battles: One One Scientist’s Journey of Adventure and Discovery

References

External links

American science writers
Living people
Cornell University alumni
Princeton University alumni
University of Montana faculty
1967 births
Recipients of the Presidential Early Career Award for Scientists and Engineers